Chisholm Catholic College is a single campus co-educational Catholic high school in Cornubia,  south-east of Brisbane, Australia, with approximately 950 year 7−12 students. Established in 1992, it is administered by Brisbane Catholic Education.

Background

Situated on an  site in Cornubia, Chisholm Catholic College opened in 1992, with an initial enrolment of 60 Year 8 students and eleven staff housed in three buildings, and become one of the first private schools in the district.
The school now caters for over 950 students.

Chisholm Catholic College's founding principal was Mike Ashton. The college's current principal is Damian Bottaccio. Martina Millard was Principal from 2015 to 2018; Christopher Leadbetter was Principal in 2014.

Caroline Chisholm
Caroline Chisholm inspired many people through her charity work and her kind nature. Her focus was on the education and employment of female immigrants. It is because of her efforts that she was selected to become the patron of the college.

Houses
Chisholm Catholic College students are allocated to one of six houses, each named after a notable Australian. Originally, there were only four houses, but Oodgeroo became the fifth House  voted by students and beating Dunlop (Australian war hero Edward Dunlop). Then Mitchel.
The houses are: 
 Flynn, named after John Flynn, founder of Australia's Royal Flying Doctor Service. The house colour is blue. John Flynn is also depicted on the $20 Australian bill.
 Mackillop, named after Mary MacKillop, founder of the Sisters of Saint Joseph who has been named as Australia's first saint. The house colour is yellow.
 Namatjira, named after Albert Namatjira, renowned landscape artist. The house colour is red.
 Oodgeroo, named after Oodgeroo Noonuccal (aka Kath Walker), poet. The house colour is purple.
 Parer, named after Damien Parer, wartime correspondent and photographer. The house colour is green.
  Mitchell, named after Roma Mitchell, the first female judge in Australia, the house colour is orange.

Buildings
Chisholm Catholic College has 14 buildings, most named after Australian native flora.
 Acacia was one of the school's original buildings prior to renovation. It is now the school's administration block.
 Banksia is a general use block with four classrooms.
 Cassia was the second of Chisholm's original buildings and now houses four science labs.
 Caroline Chisholm Centre is a multipurpose air-conditioned building complete with kitchen. It is used for hospitality functions, form meetings and liturgies. The board room forms part of the building.
 Dianella is a recent addition, better known as the 'Dining Room' and is a restaurant style kitchen which is used for hospitality-based events and functions, plus a dining room where students often present and serve food.
 Eucalyptus was the third of Chisholm's original buildings. It now houses two art rooms and a computer lab, with a hospitality kitchen, dining room and textiles room.
 Flindersia is a new building encompassing the latest in learning tools.  Almost all surfaces in the room are able to be used to draw or write on.
 Grevillea is a general use block. It houses the learning enrichment room, the computer maintenance room and also general classrooms.
 Hakea contains three computer laboratories, the business room and the Responsible Thinking Classroom or RTC for short.
 Ixora is the school's library and resource centre. It has an AV Viewing Room, two class sets of laptops and 20 computer workstations.
 Jasminium is a general use block, containing the school counsellor's office.
 Canteen is a new stand-alone building with a self-select area and two cash registers.
 Melaleuca is a large undercover area. It is used for PE classes and sporting activities. Recent building works have expanded this building considerable, and it now houses two PE classrooms, Two full-size courts, a stage area, change rooms and a gymnasium.
Father Gary Russell Centre another new building, houses music and drama classrooms equipped with the latest  technology, including a music recording studio and a drama stage with the latest lighting equipment.
 Westringia is the school's manual arts block, featuring two manual arts rooms and  a graphics room/computer lab.

References

External links
Official website
Webmaster

Catholic secondary schools in Brisbane
Schools in Logan City
Educational institutions established in 1992
1992 establishments in Australia